Beatrice station is a south-west Transitway station located in the Ottawa, Ontario, Canada suburb of Barrhaven.

It is served by OC Transpo buses and opened on November 12, 2014. Beatrice Station straddles the corner of Chapman Mills Drive and Beatrice Drive in the heart of Barrhaven's shopping core and is served by a notable rapid-transit route, route 99. Two bus stops are located on Beatrice Drive directly to the north of the intersection, serving the rapid route 80, and Connexion route 277 on weekdays during peak times.

Connexion route 406 is extended from/to Riverview Station via Nepean Woods Station and the Vimy Memorial Bridge to provide residents with improved connections to events at the Canadian Tire Centre in Kanata.

Service

The following routes serve Beatrice station as of September 5 2021:

 Route  serves both stop 2A and the north bus stop on Beatrice Drive.

References

2014 establishments in Ontario
Transitway (Ottawa) stations